Ischnocampa remissa is a moth of the family Erebidae. It was described by Paul Dognin in 1902. It is found in Venezuela.

References

 Natural History Museum Lepidoptera generic names catalog

Ischnocampa
Moths described in 1902